Sheekhall Jasiira (Somali: Shiikhaal Jaziira, Arabic: شيخال الجزيرة) also known as Shiikhaal Ba Hassan (Somali: Ba Xassan, Arabic: شيخال با حسن) are a Benadiri/12 Koofi clan mainly from the southern coastal cities of; Jasiira, Marka and Mogadishu and have established communities in the hinterlands in towns such as Afgooye and the villages around it due to trading and farming.

Overview 
The Reer Ba Hassan, who are more commonly known as Shiikhall Jasiira get their name from the town in which their patriarch first settled in (Jasiira). The tomb of their ancestor Aw 'Ismaan Ba Hassan is also buried in this village synonymous with this clan and it's destination of siyaaro (pilgrimages) to venerate their ancestor Aw 'Usmaan. This revered ancestor of the Ba Hassan is one of the "Afarta Aw 'Usmaan" (English: the 4 Osman) who are scattered along the coast of Benadir; Aw 'Usmaan Ba Hassan (Jasiira), Aw 'Usmaan Makki (Dhanaane), Aw 'Usmaan Garweyne, Aw 'Usmaan Markayaale (Marka).

References 

Somali clans